Capo d'Orlando is a  in the Metropolitan City of Messina, Sicily, southern Italy, one of the main centers of the mountain and coastal  Nebrodi area.

History

After the destruction of the Greek colony of Agathyrnum by the Roman Republican Army, the only settlement was a tiny fisherman's village. In 1925 Capo d'Orlando was elevated to the status of Comune (council), as before it was  included in the territory of Naso.

A railway station was made during the Fascist era in the early 20th century. During this century the population  and tourist development quickly grew.

Economy
Tourism is one of the main resources of the local economy.  The town also has a small marina for both fishing and tourist boats alike that also offers transportation to and from the Aeolian islands during the summer season and approximately 14 km of beaches, rocky shores that face the deep blue Tyrrenian sea making it an ideal spot to enjoy the summertime, early fall and late springtime. The location of Capo d'Orlando is also very peculiar because for a town that faces the sea, it is also very close (less than 20 km) to Nebrodi Mountain Regional Environmental Park: a fairly large extension of temperate woods, where is possible to hike to lakes, rivers, falls and tiny historical villages where everyone can enjoy the best of traditional Sicilian food and wine.

There are banks and commercial business firms along with several fair sized factories   located nearby such as "Porte IMIC" (wooden and metal door manufacturer), "irritec" and "siplast" (irrigation systems).

Another economic factor is exploitation of the extensive presence of orange and lemon fields throughout the area.

Sport

Capo d'Orlando is home to a second division basketball team, Orlandina Basket.

Twin towns
 Culver City, United States
 Conversano, Italy
 Fremantle, Australia

People
 Calogero Paparoni (1876-1958) - coffee trader migrated to Venezuela
Giuseppina Paterniti (born 1956) - RAI journalist
Lucio Piccolo (1901-1969) - poet 
 Filippo Sindoni (1933- 2006) - entrepreneur migrated to Venezuela
 Vittorio Sindoni (born 1939) - film director and screenwriter

See also
 Capo d'Orlando Lighthouse
 Villa Romana Bagnoli

References

External links
Capo d'Orlando's info 

Municipalities of the Metropolitan City of Messina
1920 establishments in Italy